The Cheboygan Daily Tribune is a daily newspaper published Tuesdays through Saturdays in Cheboygan, Michigan, United States. It is owned by Gannett.

In addition to the daily newspaper, Gannett also publishes the Shopper's Fair pennysaver and Mackinac Journal, the "magazine of the straits". The magazine is distributed bimonthly in Charlevoix, Cheboygan, Emmet, Mackinac, Otsego and Presque Isle counties.

The Tribune and Shopper's Fair circulate primarily in Cheboygan, Emmet and Presque Isle counties, including Indian River, Levering, Mackinaw City and Onaway.

Founded in the 1870s, the Tribune began daily publication in the 1910s.

References

External links 
 
 Mackinac Journal magazine
 GateHouse Media

Gannett publications
Newspapers published in Michigan
Cheboygan County, Michigan
Publications established in 1876
1876 establishments in Michigan